Raj Bhavan, Madhya Pradesh may refer to:

 Raj Bhavan, Bhopal, official residence of the governor of Madhya Pradesh, located in Bhopal.
 Raj Bhavan, Pachmarhi, official residence of the governor of Madhya Pradesh, located in Pachmarhi.